Duets II is the 59th and final studio album by American singer Frank Sinatra. It was released in 1994, and was the sequel to the previous year's Duets. Phil Ramone and Hank Cattaneo produced the album and guest artists from various genres contributed their duet parts to Sinatra's already recorded vocals.  Though not as commercially successful as Duets, it still rose to #9 on the Billboard albums chart and sold over 1 million copies in the U.S. It also peaked at #29 in the UK. 

The album received mixed reviews from critics, although some viewed it as an improvement over its predecessor. However, the album won Sinatra the 1995 Grammy Award for Best Traditional Pop Vocal Performance, his last competitive Grammy Award. 

These would be the last studio recordings made by Sinatra, who had begun his recording career fifty-four years earlier. Both were packaged together in a "90th Birthday Limited Collector's Edition" released in 2005; North American pressings add an unreleased duet recording of "My Way" with Willie Nelson, while international pressings have him singing with Luciano Pavarotti.

Track listing
Unless otherwise indicated, Information is based on Liner notes

Notes
“For Once in My Life” arranged by Don Costa in 1969.
“Bewitched, Bothered and Bewildered” originally arranged by Nelson Riddle in 1957 for Pal Joey film soundtrack.
“Moonlight in Vermont” originally arranged by Billy May in 1957. 
“Embraceable You” arranged by Nelson Riddle in 1960.
“My Funny Valentine” originally arranged by Nelson Riddle in 1957 for a Seattle, Washington concert.
“My Kind of Town” arranged by Nelson Riddle in 1963 for Robin and the 7 Hoods film soundtrack. 
“The House I Live In” music arranged by Don Costa in 1964.

Personnel 
Information is based on Liner notes
 Duet Partners - vocals (2-5, 7–14)
 Frank Sinatra Sr. – vocals (1-5, 7–14, lead on 6)
 Antonio Carlos Jobim - lead vocals, intro music performer (6)
 Gladys Knight - vocals (1)
 Stevie Wonder – harmonica, piano, vocal ad-libs (1)
 Ron Anthony – guitar
 Chuck Berghofer – bass, rhythm bass
 Edwin Bonilla - intro music performer (6)
 Ed Calle - intro music performer (6)
 Jorge Casas - intro music performer (6)
 Gregg Field – drums
 Paolo Jobim - intro music performer (6)
 Juanito Marquez - intro music performer (6)
 Bill Miller - piano
 Jorge Noriega - backing vocals (6)
 Clay Ostwald - additional keyboards (9)
 Rita Quintero – backing vocals (6)
 Arturo Sandoval - trumpet solo (7)
 Terry Trotter - piano (9)

Production
 Billy Byers - music arranger (9)
 Hank Cattaneo – producer (1, 3–14, music on 2)
 Kiko Cibrian - vocal producer (2)
 Don Costa - arranger (1, music on 14)
 Frank Foster - arranger (11)
 Tom Hensley - vocal arranger (14)
 Ted Jensen - mastering
 Quincy Jones - arranger (4, 6)
 Charles Koppelman – executive producer
 Alan Lindgren - vocal arranger (14)
 Johnny Mandel - arranger (8)
 Billy May - arranger (2, 7)
 Jose Quintana - vocal producer (2)
 Phil Ramone - producer (1, 3–14, music on 2)
 Nelson Riddle - arranger (10, 13)
 Don Rubin – executive producer
 Eliot Weisman – executive producer
 Dick Williams - vocal arranger (9)
 Patrick Williams - arranger (3, 5–6, 11–12), conductor, musical director
 Bill Zehme – liner notes

Engineers
 John Aquilino, Bernie Becker, Paul Cartledge, Bill Cavanaugh, Mike Couzzi, T-Bone Demman, Charles Dye, Geraldo Fernandes de Souza, Jr., Carl Glanville, Larry Greenhill, Don Hahn, R.R. Harlan, Jay Healy, Charles Paakkari, John Patterson, Scott Perry, Csaba Petocz, Ed Rak, Paul McKenna, George Massenburg, Dave Reitzas, Eric Schilling, Al Schmitt, Rick Southern, Ted Stein, Ron Taylor, Larry Walsh, Frank Wolf, Tom Young

Assistant engineers
 Craig Brock, Scott Canto, Marcelo Anez, Bryan Carrigan, Jim Caruana, Sean Chambers, Peter Doell, Troy Halderson, David Hall, Sebastian Krys, Mike Mazzetti, Francisco Miranda, Jennifer Monnar, Marcelo Moura, Mark Ralston, Kevin Scott, Andy Smith, Chris Wiggins

Television special
On 25 November 1994, Sinatra recorded a television special which aired on CBS, titled Sinatra: Duets. This was intended to promote both his previous album Duets as well as its successor, Duets II.

Charts

Certifications

References

1994 albums
Capitol Records albums
Frank Sinatra albums
Vocal duet albums
Albums arranged by Don Costa
Albums arranged by Nelson Riddle
Albums arranged by Johnny Mandel
Albums arranged by Billy May
Albums arranged by Quincy Jones
Albums produced by Phil Ramone
Grammy Award for Best Traditional Pop Vocal Album
Sequel albums